Smakovo (Smaq) is a rural locality (a village) and the administrative centre of Araslanovsky Selsoviet, Meleuzovsky District, Bashkortostan, Russia. The population was 444 as of 2010. There are 13 streets.

Geography 
Smakovo is located 14 km northeast of Meleuz (the district's administrative centre) by road. Yangi-Aul is the nearest rural locality.

References 

Rural localities in Meleuzovsky District